The American hip hop artist Riff Raff has released five studio albums, two remix albums, one EP, three collaborative albums, twenty mixtapes, and fifty-five singles (along with ten collaborative singles, and nineteen as a featured artist).

Albums

Studio albums

Remix albums

EPs

Collaborative albums

Mixtapes

Singles

As lead artist

Collaborative singles

As featured artist

Guest appearances
Action Bronson - "Hot Shots Part Deux" (ft.Danna Coppafeel) (2012)
Kitty - "Orion's Belt" (2012)
DJ Skee - "R.I.P.(Remix)" (ft. Jeezy, Kendrick Lamar, Chris Brown, YG) (2013)
TrapZillas - "Rainy Day" (ft. Logic Ali, Trouble Andrew) (2013)
DJ Skee - "Show Out(Skeemix) (ft. Juicy J, Pimp C, Jeezy, Ti) (2013)
Harry Fraud - "Yacht Lash" (ft. Earl Sweatshirt) High Tide EP (2013)
DJ Skee - "Karate Chop"(Remix) (ft. Lil Wayne, Future) (2013)
DJ Skee - "Bugatti"(Remix) (2013)
DJ Skee - "Like Whaaat"(Remix) (ft. Problem, Bad Lucc) (2013)
Hyper Crush - "Visions of Coleco" (2013)
Far East Movement - "The Illest" (2013)
Migos - "Jumpin Out Da Gym"(Remix) (ft. Trinid James) Young Rich Niggas (2013)
Doe Boy - "Not At All" Freebandz We Trust (2013)
Peter Jackson - "I'm In Love With That Money"(ft. OJ Da Juiceman) Good Company {2013)
Migos - "Sorry" (ft. OJ Da Juiceman, Rich The Kid) (2013)
DollaBillGates - "Fireworks" Next Level Independence EP (2013)
Diplo - "Crown" (ft. Mike Posner, Boaz Van De Beatz) (2013)
SD - "Overdose" Life of A Savage 3 (2013)
Slim Dunkin - Now That I'm On(Remix) (ft.Future, Sy Ari Da Kid, K Camp) (2013)
Spadez - "Hella Gone" (ft. Deniro Farrar) (2013)
DJ Skee - "Started from The Bottom(Remix) (ft. Drake) (2013)
Clinton Sparks - "Turnt Up" (ft. 2 Chainz, Waka Flocka)(2013)
Beautiful Lou - "Long Pinky" (ft. Action Bronson) (2013)
Diplo - "Rock Steady" (ft. Action Bronson, Mr MFN eXquire, Nicky Da Boy) Revolution EP (2013)
Grandtheft - "Trampoline"(Remix) (ft. 2 Chainz, Tinie Tempah, ETC!ETC!) (2013)
SD - "Overdose" Life Of A Savage 3 (2013)
Black Dave - "Golden Boys" Black Dave Presents Black Bart (2013)
Rich the Kid - "Famous" (ft. Migos) Feel's Good To Be Rich (2014)
DJ Noodles - "Instagram" (2014)
Adrian Lau - "Stopwatch" (ft. Charlie Bars) Projection (2014)
Far East Movement - "The Illest"(Remix) (ft. Schoolboy Q, B.O.B) (2014)
Wrekonize - "Easy Money"(Remix) (ft. Bun B, Jackie Chain) Strangulation (2014)
Katy Perry - "This Is How We Do"(Remix) (2014)
BeatKing - "Rambunctious" (ft. Danny Brown) Underground Cassette Tape Music (2014)
Audio Push - "Fwd Back" (ft. King Chip) (2014)
Curtis Williams - "Drip" Ransom (2014)
Mike Will Made It - "Syrup In My Soda" (ft. ILoveMakonnen) (2014)
Mike Will Made It - "Choppin Blades" (ft. Slim Jxmmi Of Rae Sremmurd) Ransom (2014)
Kirko Bangz - "I Then Came Dine" (2014)
Peter Jackson - "Prom Night" (2014)
The Joker - "F.H.I.T.O." (Remix) (ft. K Camp) (2014)
DollaBillGates - "Jag Porsche" On Me (2014)
BeatKing - "Rich N Famous" (ft. Paul Wall) Club God 4 (2015)
Curren$y - "Froze" Pilot Talk III (2015)
The Joker - "FHITO" (ft. K Camp, Raven Felix) (2015)
Yowda - "Wish That I Was Playin" (2015)
Dorrough Music - "Drive Reckless" Shut The City Down 2 (2015)
1st - "Hurtin" (ft. Rich The Kid) First Time For Everything (2015)
J Stalin - "Real Niggaz Only" (ft. Lamsu!) Tears Of Joy (2015)
Gucci Mane - "Embarrassed" (ft. Post Malone, Lil B) East Atlanta Santa 2 (2015)
Gucci Mane - "Bitches Ain't Shit" (ft. Lil B, Sy Ari Da Kid) Trapology (2015)
Gucci Mane - "Scared Of The Dark" (ft. Father) Trapology (2015)
Gucci Mane - "I'm Too Much" King Gucci (2015)
Young Chop - "Ring Ring Ring" (ft. Chief Keef) King Chop (2016)
Various Artists - "18 Years" (ft. Slim Thug) Audiomack EP (2017)
DJ Paul - "Real Fake" Underground Vol.17 for da summa (2017)
Smokepurpp - "How That Make U Feel" (2017)
Splash Zanotti - "M.O.B" (ft. Lil Pump) (2017)
DollaBillGates - "Walk Drip" Narconomics (2017)
Jimmy Wopo - "Move Wit The $" Jordan Kobe (2017)
Nacho Picasso - "Want It All" The Role Model EP (2018)
Yung Gravy - “Richard Simmons” (2019)

References

Discographies of American artists
Hip hop discographies